The Department of Public Service and Administration (DPSA) is a department of the South African government that is responsible for the organisation and administration of the civil service. It is responsible for matters including labour relations of government employees, the provision of government IT services, and integrity in public administration. Political responsibility for the department is held by the Minister of Public Service and Administration, assisted by a deputy.  the minister is Senzo Mchunu and his deputy is Sindisiwe Chikunga. In the 2020 budget the department received an appropriation of R565.7 million. In the 2018/19 financial year it had 444 employees.

References

External links
 

Public Service and Administration
South Africa